Poison is the second studio album by American rapper and producer Swizz Beatz. It is Beatz' first album as a lead artist since his 2007 album One Man Band Man. Poison was released on November 2, 2018 by Epic Records. It features collaborations with Nas, Lil Wayne, Kendrick Lamar, and Young Thug, among others. The music video for the song "Pistol on My Side (P.O.M.S.)", featuring Lil Wayne and keyboards by Alicia Keys, was released on September 14, 2018. The single "25 Soldiers" was released on October 3, 2018.

Background
Beatz credited J. Cole as executive producer alongside him as he advised him on song selection and album release. Beatz had recorded 70 songs for the album and used 10. He said he removed songs that were potential radio and chart hits. Three of the songs not included on the album are a track featuring Kanye West and Bono, another featuring Bruno Mars, and a collaboration with Jay Z, Nas, DMX, and Jadakiss that Beatz had previewed at a DJ battle with Just Blaze in 2017. Beatz said that the latter song will be released "when the timing is right". On the collaborations with other artists, he stated: "I handed all the creativity on the album to the artists, in their comfort zone. I didn’t make it about Swizz. It’s my album, but I’m a producer, and it needs to be about the artists that are on it". The album artwork, titled "End of Empire", was created by Los Angeles-based artist Cleon Peterson, and represents "upending the system, taking power back from the corrupt and fighting for justice." Producers on the album include Beatz, AraabMuzik, MusicMan Ty and Avery Chambliss.

Release
The track list and album artwork was released by Beatz on September 13, 2018. "Pistol on My Side (P.O.M.S.)", featuring rapper Lil Wayne and Alicia Keys on piano, was the first song released, with its music video premiering on September 14, 2018. On October 3, "25 Soldiers" was released as a single. The album became available for pre-order at midnight September 14, 2018. It was released on November 2, 2018 by Epic Records.

Track listing

Track listing information is taken from the official liner notes and credits from Qobuz and Tidal.

Notes
 Violin on "Poison Intro" is composed and performed by Ezinma.
 Keyboards on "Pistol On My Side (P.O.M.S)" are performed by Alicia Keys.

Charts

References

2018 albums
Swizz Beatz albums
Epic Records albums
Albums produced by Swizz Beatz